Thomas Barry was an English politician who was MP for Plympton Erle in May 1413 and married Isabel.

References

14th-century births
15th-century deaths
Members of the Parliament of England for Plympton Erle
English MPs May 1413